Missen may refer to:

Surname 
Alan Missen (1925–1986), Australian politician
Edward Missen (1875–1927), English cricketer
François Missen (born 1933), French journalist

Places  
Missen-Wilhams, is a municipality in the district of Oberallgäu in Bavaria
Missen Ridge, is a long, ice-covered ridge situated south of Davis Ice Piedmont, on the north coast of Victoria Land, Antarctica